Richard Kraut is the Charles and Emma Morrison Professor in the Humanities at Northwestern University.

Biography 
Richard Kraut got his M.S. from the University of Michigan, and his Ph.D. from Princeton University in 1969.

Bibliography

Books 
 Socrates and the State (Princeton UP: 1984).
 Aristotle on the Human Good (Princeton UP: 1989).
 Aristotle Politics Books VII and VIII, traduction avec commentaires (Clarendon: 1997).
 Aristotle: Political Philosophy (Oxford UP: 2002)
 What is Good and Why: The Ethics of Well-Being (Harvard UP: 2007).
 How to Read Plato (Granta Books : 2008).
 Against Absolute Goodness (Oxford University Press: 2011).

Editor 
 The Cambridge Companion to Plato (Cambridge, 1992).
 Plato's Republic: Critical Essays (Rowman & Littlefield, 1997).
 Aristotle's Politics: Critical Essays (with Steven Skultety, Rowman & Littlefield, 2005)
 The Blackwell Guide to Aristotle's Nicomachean Ethics (2006)

Articles 
 Two Conceptions of Happiness, The Philosophical Review 88 (1979), . (Reprinted in Louis Pojman, ed., Ethical Theory: Classical and Contemporary Readings, Wadsworth Publishing Co., 1989; also in William H. Shaw, ed., Social and Personal Ethics, Wadsworth Publishing Co., 1993, and in T.I. Irwin, ed., Articles on Greek and Roman Philosophy, Garland Publishing Inc.
 The Defense of Justice in Plato's Republic, in R. Kraut (ed.), The Cambridge Companion to Plato, Cambridge University Press, 1992, .
 Return to the Cave: Republic 519-521, In Oxford Readings in Philosophy: Plato: Ethics, Politics, Religion, and the Soul, ed. by Gail Fine, Oxford University Press, 1999
 Doing Without Morality: Reflections on the Meaning of Dein in Aristotle's Nicomachean Ethics, Oxford Studies in Ancient Philosophy, mai 2006, .
 How to Justify Ethical Propositions, in Richard Kraut (ed.), The Blackwell Guide to Aristotle's Nicomachean Ethics, (2006, .
 The Examined Life, Sara Ahbel-Rappe & Rachana Kamtekar (eds.), A Companion to Socrates. Blackwell (2006, pp. 228–42).
 An Aesthetic Reading of Aristotle’s Ethics. In Verity Harte and Melissa Lane (eds.), Politeia: Essays in Honour of Malcolm Schofield, Cambridge University Press, 2013.
 Human Diversity and the Nature of Well-Being: Reflections on Sumner’s Methodology, Res Philosophica, vol. 90, nº 3, juillet 2013, .
 “Précis: Against Absolute Goodness” and “Replies to Stroud, Thomson, and Crisp,” Philosophy and Phenomenological Research, Vol. 87, nº 2,  et , septembre 2013.

References

20th-century American philosophers
21st-century American philosophers
1944 births
Living people
Northwestern University faculty
Princeton University alumni
University of Illinois Chicago faculty